Colonnade Restaurant was a historic restaurant in Tampa, Florida established in 1935. It was operated for at least three generations by the Whiteside family. The restaurant was known for its water views (on Bayshore Boulevard) and its seafood.

The Colonnade Restaurant was closed in the spring of 2016 when it was sold for $6.2 million to Ascentia Development Group and Batson-Cook Development Co.

See also
 List of seafood restaurants

References

Restaurants established in 1935
1935 establishments in Florida
Restaurants in Tampa, Florida
Seafood restaurants in Florida
Defunct seafood restaurants in the United States
2016 disestablishments in Florida
Restaurants disestablished in 2016
Defunct restaurants in Florida